Najam Aziz Sethi (Urdu, ; born 20 May 1948) is a Pakistani journalist, businessman and cricket administrator, currently serving as the chairman of Pakistan Cricket Board (PCB). He also is the founder of The Friday Times and Vanguard Books. He has served as a caretaker Federal Minister of Pakistan and Chief Minister of Punjab.

As a journalist, he is a left-leaning political commentator who serves as the editor-in-chief of The Friday Times and serves as Chairman of Pakistan Super League. He has also served as the caretaker chief minister of Punjab during the 2013 election. He formerly used to host primetime current affairs show Aapas ki Baat on Geo News. He is currently the President of AAP Media Media Network / Indus News.

Najam Sethi began his sociopolitical endeavours with the socialist movement working for the rights of Balochistan, leading to his arrest in 1975 before being discharged in 1978. He consequently left politics and established Vanguard Books, a progressive book publishing company.

In 1989, Sethi along with his wife Jugnu Mohsin launched an independent English weekly, The Friday Times. He was arrested by the second Nawaz Sharif government in 1999 on trumped-up charges of treason before being released by the Supreme Court of Pakistan. In 2002, he founded the Daily Times of Pakistan and became its editor until leaving in October 2009. He also served as the Pakistan correspondent of The Economist from 1990 to 2008.

Sethi won the 1999 International Press Freedom Award of the US-based Committee to Protect Journalists and the 2009 World Association of Newspapers' Golden Pen of Freedom Award. On 26 March 2013, his name was approved for the interim position of the chief minister of Punjab as a result of consensus between members of the selection committee comprising individuals from both the governing and the opposing political parties. He took the oath on 27 March 2013, and left the office after the May 2013 elections on 6 June 2013.

Career 
According to Sethi, he first conceived of the idea for an independent Pakistani newspaper out of frustration: while briefly imprisoned in 1984 on trumped-up copyright charges, no newspapers had protested his arrest. The following year, he and Mohsin applied for a publishing licence under Mohsin's name, since Sethi was "too notorious an offender" to be use the application, Mohsin told him that she intended to publish "a social chit chat thing, you know, with lots of pictures of parties and weddings". It was finally approved in 1987, but Mohsin requested a one-year delay to avoid the first issue coming out during the dictatorship of General Zia ul Haq. The paper's first issue appeared in May 1989.

1999 arrest
In early 1999, Sethi gave an interview to a team for the  BBC television show Correspondent, which was planning to report on corruption in the Nawaz Sharif government. At the beginning of May, he was warned by contacts that his co-operation with the team was being interpreted by the Nawaz Sharif government as an attempt to destabilize it and that officials were planning Sethi's arrest. On 8 May, he was taken from his home by personnel of Punjab Police. According to Sethi's wife Mohsin, at least eight armed officers broke into the house, assaulting the family's security guards; when asked to produce a warrant, one of them threatened simply to shoot Sethi on the spot. Mohsin was tied up and left locked in another room.

Sethi was then held for almost a month without charge. He was kept incommunicado at a detention center in Lahore. Amnesty International stated its belief that his arrest was connected with his investigations into government corruption, and designated him a prisoner of conscience. The US-based Committee to Protect Journalists also sent a protest letter to  Prime Minister Nawaz Sharif, noting the organisation's dismay "that the state continues its persecution of independent journalists", and World Bank president James Wolfensohn called Sharif to urge Sethi's release.

On 1 June, authorities charged Sethi with "Condemnation of the Creation of the State and Advocacy of Abolition of its Sovereignty" and "Promoting Enmity Between Different Groups" and transferred him to police custody. However, the following day, the Supreme Court of Pakistan ruled that the government had provided insufficient evidence to justify Sethi's detention. He was released, and the charges against him were dropped.

My Feudal Lord
In June 1991, Mohsin and Sethi's publishing company, Vanguard Books, released Tehmina Durrani's My Feudal Lord, a "politically explosive" book about her marriage with leading politician Mustafa Khar. In the book, Durrani alleges that Khar mistreated and abused her. It was an "instant sensation" and later became the "hottest book in Pakistan's history". Durrani signed a contract vesting foreign rights with Mohsin and giving her 50% of foreign royalties.

On 19 May 1999, however—during Sethi's one-month incommunicado detention—Durrani called a press conference to denounce him as having stolen all of her earnings from the book, stating that his actions were "an even bigger case of hypocrisy than my experience with the feudal system". Durrani sued Sethi for mental torture, and he countersued for defamation. An earlier dispute over the foreign rights had been settled out of court in 1992. A review of the contracts by the UK newspaper The Independent described Sethi as acting in good faith and described him and Mohsin as "the injured party".

In 2008, when Sethi's newspapers ran a series of editorials opposing religious fundamentalism, the Taliban threatened him with death, causing him to live under constant guard. Sethi also received death threats in July 2008 for publishing an editorial cartoon showing Umme Hassaan, principal of a girls' school, encouraging young women in burqas to "kidnap Chinese masseuses". The joke referred to Lal Masjid, the fundamentalist Masjid at which her husband Abdul Aziz Ghazi was a  cleric; the mosque had kidnapped six Chinese women that it accused of being prostitutes, leading to Ghazi's arrest.

Caretaker Chief Minister of Punjab 
Najam Sethi was appointed as the caretaker  Chief Minister of Punjab on 26 March 2013, for the 2013 Pakistani general election, which were scheduled to be held on 11 May 2013. His name was presented by the opposition, PPP, and the governing party, PML(N) agreed on it. He was then chosen to be the caretaker Chief Minister. On 6 June 2013, he was replaced by the newly elected leader Shehbaz Sharif. PTI, the party that lost the 2013 elections, had accused Najam Sethi of fixing the elections in 35 constituencies and famously called them the 35 punctures.

Chairman of the Pakistan Cricket Board

First term 
Nawaz Sharif, the Prime minister at the time,  appointed him as the acting chairman of the Pakistan Cricket Board after the Islamabad High Court ordered the appointment of an interim chairman until a pending case on the serving chairman, Zaka Ashraf, was decided. Later, a two-member bench of Islamabad high court cleared Zaka Ashraf and ordered his restoration as chairman PCB. Sethi then relinquished chairmanship.

Second term 
In August 2017, Sethi was elected unanimously as PCB chairman for a second time after no other member of the Board of Governors stood for the position. After Imran Khan was elected into power after the 2018 general elections, Najam Sethi resigned as Chairman of PCB. Shortly after his resignation, Imran Khan announced that former ICC President Ehsan Mani would succeed Sethi.

Third term 
After Imran Khan was ousted from government through a vote of no confidence in April 2022, Sethi was appointed the Chairman of PCB for a third term in December 2022, along with 13 board members by the new prime minister, Shehbaz Sharif.

Personal life 
Sethi is married to fellow journalist Jugnu Mohsin, the publisher of The Friday Times. The couple have two children: author and singer Ali Sethi and journalist and actress Mira Sethi.

Awards and recognition 
In 1999, Sethi and Mohsin were both given the International Press Freedom Award of the US-based Committee to Protect Journalists, which recognises journalists who show courage in defending press freedom despite facing attacks, threats, or imprisonment. Ten years later, he was awarded the 2009 Golden Pen of Freedom, the annual press freedom prize of the World Association of Newspapers. Hilal-i-Imtiaz Award in 2011 by the President of Pakistan.

References

External links 

 
 Vanguard Books

Chief Minister of Punjab

1948 births
Alumni of Clare College, Cambridge
Chief Ministers of Punjab, Pakistan
Living people
Pakistani political journalists
Pakistani columnists
Pakistani newspaper founders
Government College University, Lahore alumni
Journalists from Lahore
Pakistan Cricket Board Presidents and Chairmen
Geo News newsreaders and journalists
Najam
English-language writers from Pakistan
Pakistani newspaper publishers (people)
St. Anthony's High School, Lahore alumni
Imprisoned journalists
Amnesty International prisoners of conscience held by Pakistan
Pakistani opinion journalists
Pakistani prisoners and detainees
Pakistani YouTubers
Federal ministers of Pakistan
Pakistani Marxists
People of the insurgency in Balochistan
Pakistani activists
Punjabi people